Sarah Kemp (born 7 December 1985) is an Australian professional golfer. She has played on the LPGA Tour, Ladies European Tour (LET) and ALPG Tour.

As an amateur, Kemp earned low amateur honors at the 2003 Women's Australian Open and also won the 2003 Australian Girls' Amateur, followed by a runner-up finish in 2004. In 2003 and 2005, Kemp was the Australian Stroke Play Champion and was a member of the 2004 Australian Espirito Santo Trophy World Cup team.

In 2006, Kemp recorded six top-10 finishes on the ALPG Tour, finishing second on the ALPG Tour Order of Merit, while also recording three top-10 finishes on the LET. In 2007, she birdied her final four holes at the LPGA Final Qualifying Tournament to tie for ninth and earn exempt status for the 2008 LPGA Tour.

On the LET, Kemp was runner-up at the 2010 New Zealand Women's Open and the 2018 Lalla Meryem Cup, where she lost a playoff to Jenny Haglund, while finishing third at the 2016 Fatima Bint Mubarak Ladies Open, 2017 Hero Women's Indian Open and 2018 Lacoste Ladies Open de France. Her best result on the LPGA tour was as runner-up at the 2019 Women's Victorian Open.

Amateur wins
2003 Australian Women's Amateur Stroke Play Championship, Australian Girls' Amateur
2005 Australian Women's Amateur Stroke Play Championship

Professional wins

WPGA Tour of Australasia wins (13)
2006 Optus World Coraki Golf Club Pro-Am, Titanium Ladies Golf Classic, Jack Newton Celebrity Classic
2007 St Georges Basin Country Club Pro-Am
2009 ActewAGL Royal Canberra Pro-Am
2010 Xstrata Coal Branxton Golf Club Pro-Am, Lady Anne Funerals ALPG Pro-Am
2011 Lady Anne Funerals Ryde Parramatta Pro-Am
2015 McLeod ALPG Pro-Am
2017 BWAC Regional Employment Services Pro Am
2018 Anita Boon Pro Am
2019 Aoyuan International Moss Vale Pro Am
2023 TPS Sydney (leading female)

Playoff record
Ladies European Tour playoff record (0–1)

Results in LPGA majors
Results not in chronological order before 2018.

^ The Evian Championship was added as a major in 2013

CUT = missed the half-way cut
NT = no tournament
T = tied

Team appearances
Amateur
Espirito Santo Trophy (representing Australia): 2004
Commonwealth Trophy (representing Australia): 2003 (winners)
Tasman Cup (representing Australia): 2003 (winners), 2005
Queen Sirikit Cup (representing Australia): 2003, 2004, 2005

Professional
The Queens (representing Australia): 2015, 2016, 2017

References

External links

Australian female golfers
ALPG Tour golfers
LPGA Tour golfers
Ladies European Tour golfers
People educated at Endeavour Sports High School
Golfers from Sydney
Sportswomen from New South Wales
1985 births
Living people